A dyewood is any of a number of varieties of wood which provide dyes for textiles and other purposes.  Among the more important are:

Brazilwood or Brazil from Brazil, producing a red dye.
Catechu or cutch from Acacia wood, producing a dark brown dye. 
Old Fustic from India and Africa, producing a yellow dye.  
Logwood from Belize, producing a red or purple dye.

References

Plant dyes
Wood
Wood products